J Nandakumar may refer to:

Places
 Nandha kumar, Palaya palayam, Erode district, Tamilnadu state, India, Asia.
 Nandakumar, Purba Medinipur, a village in Tamluk subdivision of Purba Medinipur district in the state of West Bengal, India.

People 
 Laishram Nandakumar Singh, politician from Manipur, India
 Maharaja Nandakumar (died 1775), Mughal Indian tax official best known for his connection with Warren Hastings
 Nandakumar Puspanathan (born 1974), Malaysian rally driver
 Pratibha Nandakumar (born 1955), noted Kannada writer and theatre activist

Other
 Nandakumar (film), a 1938 Indian Tamil-language film